Epiperipatus simoni is a species of velvet worm in the Peripatidae family. This species is dark brown without any pattern on its dorsal surface. Females of this species range from 40 mm to 68 mm in length and have 28 to 32 pairs of legs. The type locality is in Venezuela.

References

Onychophorans of tropical America
Onychophoran species
Animals described in 1899